SunExpress Deutschland GmbH was a German leisure airline headquartered in Gateway Gardens, Flughafen, Frankfurt. It was a subsidiary of SunExpress, which itself is a joint-venture of Turkish Airlines and Lufthansa. Its main base was Frankfurt Airport with smaller bases at several other airports throughout Germany. The company ceased all operations in 2020.

History
SunExpress Deutschland was founded on 8 June 2011 as a subsidiary of SunExpress and started operations with three Boeing 737-800s. It was founded in order to fly from Germany to the Red Sea using the German AOC. These routes have been served on 2 November 2011 for the first time and the network has since been extended to several more leisure destinations in Southern Europe and North Africa.

In February 2015, the Lufthansa Group announced that SunExpress Deutschland would be the operator of Eurowings' new long-haul operations, which are based at Cologne Bonn Airport, from November 2015. SunExpress Deutschland therefore has received leased Airbus A330-200s.

On 23 June 2020 SunExpress announced SunExpress Deutschland would cease operations in 2020 and orderly be liquidated. Its route network would partially be taken over by SunExpress and Eurowings.

Destinations

Operated as SunExpress Deutschland
As of February 2018, SunExpress Deutschland operated the following routes:
Bulgaria
Burgas - Burgas Airport
Varna - Varna Airport

Bosnia and Herzegovina
Sarajevo - Sarajevo International Airport

Egypt
Hurghada - Hurghada International Airport
Marsa Alam - Marsa Alam International Airport

Germany
Berlin - Tegel Airport
Cologne/Bonn - Cologne Bonn Airport Focus city
Düsseldorf - Düsseldorf Airport Focus city 
Frankfurt - Frankfurt Airport Base
Hannover - Hannover Airport Focus city 
Leipzig - Leipzig/Halle Airport
Munich - Munich Airport Focus city
Stuttgart - Stuttgart Airport Focus city

Greece
Athens - Athens International Airport
Heraklion - Heraklion International Airport

Italy
Lamezia Terme - Lamezia Terme International Airport

Lebanon
Beirut - Beirut–Rafic Hariri International Airport

Morocco
Agadir - Agadir Airport

Norway
Oslo - Oslo Airport

Spain
Madrid - Barajas Airport
Barcelona - El Prat Airport
Fuerteventura - Fuerteventura Airport
Lanzarote - Lanzarote Airport
Palma de Mallorca - Palma de Mallorca Airport

Turkey
Adana - Adana Şakirpaşa Airport
Ankara - Esenboğa International Airport
Antalya - Antalya Airport
Bodrum - Bodrum Airport
Dalaman - Dalaman Airport
Elazığ - Elazığ Airport
Gaziantep - Oğuzeli Airport
Istanbul - Sabiha Gökçen International Airport
Izmir - Adnan Menderes Airport
Kayseri - Erkilet International Airport
Samsun - Samsun-Çarşamba Airport
Trabzon - Trabzon Airport

Operated for Eurowings
As of July 2017, SunExpress Deutschland operated the following long-haul routes for Eurowings:

Barbados
Bridgetown - Grantley Adams International Airport seasonal

Cuba
Havana - Jose Marti International Airport
Varadero - Juan Gualberto Gómez Airport

Dominican Republic
Punta Cana - Punta Cana International Airport
Puerto Plata - Gregorio Luperón International Airport

Germany
Düsseldorf - Düsseldorf Airport Base

Jamaica
Montego Bay - Sangster International Airport

Mauritius
Port Louis - Sir Seewoosagur Ramgoolam International Airport

Mexico
Cancún - Cancún International Airport

Namibia
Windhoek - Hosea Kutako International Airport

Thailand
Bangkok - Suvarnabhumi Airport
Phuket - Phuket International Airport

United States of America
Fort Myers - Southwest Florida International Airport
Las Vegas - McCarran International Airport
Miami - Miami International Airport
Orlando - Orlando International Airport
Seattle - Seattle/Tacoma International Airport

Fleet

As of January 2020, the SunExpress Deutschland fleet consisted of the following aircraft:

References

External links

Defunct airlines of Germany
Airlines established in 2010
Airlines disestablished due to the COVID-19 pandemic
Airlines disestablished in 2020
Defunct charter airlines
Lufthansa
Turkish Airlines